Olive Wilson (c. 1905–1948) was an Irish badminton player.

Biography
Olive Wilson was born in Derry around 1905, and later moved to Belfast looking for employment. She was one of the highest ranking players from Northern Ireland in the 1930s. She played for Ireland 16 times between 1923 and 1939, winning the Irish Open several times and was also successful in the national tournaments including the Welsh International, the Denmark Open and the Scottish Open. Wilson died of tuberculosis in 1948.

Achievements

References

1900s births
1948 deaths
Irish female badminton players
20th-century deaths from tuberculosis
Tuberculosis deaths in Ireland